Ali Alavi FRS (born May 10, 1966) is a professor of theoretical chemistry in the Department of Chemistry at the University of Cambridge and a Director of the Max Planck Institute for Solid State Research in Stuttgart.

Education
Alavi was born in Tehran and was educated at the University of Cambridge where he was awarded a Bachelor of Arts degree in Natural Sciences followed by a PhD in 1990 for research on the molecular dynamics of thin films and charge-transfer complexes.

Research and career
His research is focused on the electron correlation and the Schrödinger equations, combining quantum chemistry with Monte Carlo methods, which enable solutions to problems which are very difficult to solve using standard Ab initio quantum chemistry methods alone. His research has been funded by the Engineering and Physical Sciences Research Council (EPSRC). Before working in Cambridge and Stuttgart, he held an academic post at Queen's University Belfast.

Awards and honours
Alavi was elected a Fellow of the Royal Society (FRS) in 2015. His certificate of election reads: 

Alavi was also elected a scientific member of the Max Planck Society in 2013 and a Fellow of the Royal Society of Chemistry (FRSC) in 2015.

References

Living people
Fellows of the Royal Society
British chemists
Members of the University of Cambridge Department of Chemistry
Theoretical chemists
Fellows of the Royal Society of Chemistry
Fellows of Trinity College, Cambridge
Max Planck Institute directors
1966 births
People from Tehran